Talu Sarak (also Romanized as Talū Sarak) is a village in Baladeh Rural District, Khorramabad District, Tonekabon County, Mazandaran Province, Iran. At the 2006 census, its population was 104, in 29 families.

References 

Populated places in Tonekabon County